The Great Love is a 1969 French comedy film directed by Pierre Étaix. It was entered into the 1969 Cannes Film Festival.

Cast
 Pierre Étaix as Pierre
 Annie Fratellini as Florence
 Nicole Calfan as Agnès
 Alain Janey as Jacques
 Magali Clément as Irène
 Ketty France as Madame Girard
 Louis Maiss as Mr. Girard
 Jacqueline Rouillard as Madame Louise
 Billy Bourbon as Drunkard
 Micha Bayard as Bourget's secretary
 Claude Massot as Waiter

References

External links

1969 films
1969 comedy films
French comedy films
1960s French-language films
Films directed by Pierre Étaix
Films with screenplays by Jean-Claude Carrière
1960s French films